Pavia Township is a township in Bedford County, Pennsylvania, United States. The population was 284 at the 2020 census. The township was known as Union Township until it changed its name to Pavia Township sometime during the period 1993 to 1995.

Geography
Pavia Township is located in the northwestern corner of Bedford County, bordered to the west by Cambria County and to the north by Blair County. A large portion of the township is occupied by Blue Knob State Park, including the  summit of Blue Knob, the second highest peak in Pennsylvania. Pennsylvania Route 869 is the only major road that passes through the township.

Recreation
In addition to Blue Knob State Park, a portion of the Pennsylvania State Game Lands Number 26 occupies the northwestern portion of the township.

Demographics

As of the census of 2000, there were 325 people, 122 households, and 91 families residing in the township.  The population density was 14.8 people per square mile (5.7/km2).  There were 191 housing units at an average density of 8.7/sq mi (3.4/km2).  The racial makeup of the township was 99.69% White and 0.31% Asian. Hispanic or Latino of any race were 0.31% of the population.

There were 122 households, out of which 33.6% had children under the age of 18 living with them, 62.3% were married couples living together, 8.2% had a female householder with no husband present, and 25.4% were non-families. 15.6% of all households were made up of individuals, and 6.6% had someone living alone who was 65 years of age or older.  The average household size was 2.66 and the average family size was 2.97.

In the township the population was spread out, with 24.6% under the age of 18, 6.8% from 18 to 24, 31.1% from 25 to 44, 26.2% from 45 to 64, and 11.4% who were 65 years of age or older.  The median age was 37 years. For every 100 females there were 112.4 males.  For every 100 females age 18 and over, there were 100.8 males.

The median income for a household in the township was $35,000, and the median income for a family was $38,750. Males had a median income of $25,000 versus $21,250 for females. The per capita income for the township was $16,115.  About 5.8% of families and 9.1% of the population were below the poverty line, including 7.0% of those under age 18 and 19.0% of those age 65 or over.

References

Populated places established in 1794
Townships in Bedford County, Pennsylvania
1794 establishments in Pennsylvania